Malcolm Kerr  may refer to:

 Malcolm H. Kerr (1931–1984), American university professor killed by gunmen in Beirut
 Malcolm Kerr (cricketer) (1877–?), West Indian cricketer
 Malcolm Kerr (politician) (born 1950), Australian politician